Arnold is the name of several unincorporated communities in the U.S. state of West Virginia.

Arnold, Brooke County, West Virginia
Arnold, Lewis County, West Virginia